Helmës may refer to the following places in Albania:

Helmës, Berat, a village in the municipality of Skrapar, Berat County
Helmës, Korçë, a village in the municipality of Kolonjë, Korçë County
Helmas, a village in the municipality of Kavajë, Tirana County